The nasopalatine nerve (long sphenopalatine nerve) is a nerve of the head. It is a branch of the pterygopalatine ganglion, a continuation from the maxillary nerve (V2). It supplies parts of the palate and nasal septum.

Structure 
The nasopalatine nerve communicates with the corresponding nerve of the opposite side and with the greater palatine nerve. The medial superior posterior nasal branches of the maxillary nerve usually branch from the nasopalatine nerve.

Origin 
The nasopalatine nerve is a branch of the pterygopalatine ganglion, a continuation from the maxillary nerve (V2), itself a branch of the trigeminal nerve.

Course 
It exits the pterygopalatine fossa through the sphenopalatine foramen to enter the nasal cavity. It passes across the roof of the nasal cavity below the orifice of the sphenoidal sinus to reach the posterior part of the nasal septum. It passes anteroinferiorly upon the nasal septum along a groove upon the vomer, running between the periosteum and mucous membrane of the lower part of the nasal septum. It then passes through the hard palate by descending through the incisive canal to reach the roof of the mouth.

Distribution 
The nasopalatine nerve supplies the anterior-most portion of the palate (the mucous membrane of the palate just posterior to the upper incisors), as well as the posteroinferior portion of the nasal septum.

Clinical significance 
The nasopalatine nerve may be anaesthetised in order to performs surgery on the hard palate or the soft palate.

History 
The nasopalatine nerve was first identified by Domenico Cotugno.

Additional images

See also 
 Foramina of Scarpa

References

External links 
 
 
 Diagram 1 at adi-visuals.com
 Diagram 2 at adi-visuals.com

Nerves